Southern Russia or the South of Russia (Yug Rossii) is a colloquial term for the southernmost geographic portion of European Russia generally covering the Southern Federal District and the North Caucasian Federal District.

The term does not conform to any official areas of the Russian Federation as designated by the Russian Classification on Objects of Administrative Division (OKATO).

History

The Caucasus has been inhabited for millennia. Eastern Slavic tribes, like the Antes, inhabited Southern Russia at least from the 3rd century. Southern Russia played an important role in the influence of Byzantine culture on Russia. Persian culture has also left its traces in Southern Russia. At the beginning of the second millennium, between Volga and Don, Turkic tribes established in the South of Russia Tatar states. According to historical sources, the Russian lands in Southern Russia adopted the Islamic faith after contact with the Mongols.

During the Russian Civil War (1917–1922), a territory called South Russia briefly existed from 1919 to 1920, which spanned the southern parts of the Russian Empire, including portions of Ukraine. In Soviet historiography, it also was referred to as "White South" in reference to the White Army that fought the Bolsheviks there along with the Armed Forces of South Russia and the Volunteer Army.

General area

Since the dissolution of the Soviet Union in 1991, the area of Southern Russia spans two of the nine federal districts of Russia containing 19 federal constituent entities, six of which are disputed with Ukraine:

Southern Federal District:
 Republic of Adygea
 Astrakhan Oblast
 Republic of Crimea 
 Donetsk People's Republic
 Republic of Kalmykia
 Kherson Region
 Krasnodar Krai
 Lugansk People's Republic
 Rostov Oblast
 Sevastopol
 Volgograd Oblast
 Zaporozhye Region

North Caucasian Federal District:
 Republic of Dagestan
 Republic of Ingushetia
 Kabardino-Balkar Republic
  Karachay-Cherkess Republic
 Republic of North Ossetia-Alania
  Stavropol Krai
 Chechen Republic

In relation to the official economic regions of Russia, most of Southern Russia is included in the North Caucasus economic region, with the exception of the Astrakhan Oblast, the Republic of Kalmykia and the Volgograd Oblast, which are part of the Volga economic region. References to "Southern Russia" can be found in media or news portals devoted to the area. Newspapers and websites like Rossiyskaya Gazeta and Vedomosti have sections or tags for the area.

See also 
 Southern Russian dialects
 Northern Russian dialects
 Federal districts of Russia
 Subdivisions of Russia

References

External links
 ЯСНО (Clearly), news portal
 Southru.ino, news portal

 
Regions of Russia
Geography of Eastern Europe